Loch Iubhair pronounced yoo-ar meaning yew loch, is a freshwater loch, located in Glen Dochart, and  east of the village of Crianlarich. Loch Dochart is located immediately southeast, and the outflow of Loch Dochart, as the River Dochart flows into Loch Iubhair.

References

Iubhair
Tay catchment
Iubhair